The following lists events that have happened in 1908 in the Qajar dynasty in Iran.

Incumbents
 Monarch: Mohammad Ali Shah Qajar
 Prime Minister: 
 until May 21: Hossein-Qoli Nezam al-Saltaneh Mafi
 May 21-June 7: vacant
 starting June 7: Ahmad Moshir al-Saltaneh

Events
 Mohammad Ali Shah Qajar exploit divisions with the ranks of the reformers and eliminate the Majlis.
 June 23 – Vladimir Liakhov a Russian Cossack Brigade commander shelled Majles and executed several leaders of Constitutional Movement.
 June - Siege of Astarabad

References

 
Iran
Years of the 20th century in Iran
1900s in Iran
Iran